The City of Griffith is a local government area in the Riverina region of south-western New South Wales, Australia. The area comprises  and is located in the Murrumbidgee Irrigation Area and on Kidman Way.

The Mayor of the City of Griffith Council is Clr. Doug Curran, an unaligned politician.

Main towns and villages
In addition to Griffith, the area includes the towns and villages of Willbriggie, Hanwood, Beelbangera, Bilbul, Yoogali, Widgelli, Yenda, Lake Wyangan, Tharbogang and Warburn and the suburbs of Collina, Driver, North Griffith, East Griffith, West Griffith, South Griffith, Murrumbidgee, Mayfair, Pioneer Mooreville and Wickhams Hill.

Demographics
Aboriginal and Torres Strait Islander people made up 4.1 per cent of the population, which was higher than the national and state averages of 2.5 per cent. The median age of people in the City of Griffith LGA was 36 years, which was slightly lower than the national median of 37 years. Children aged 0 – 14 years made up 22.5 per cent of the population and people aged 65 years and over made up 19.8 per cent of the population. Of people in the area aged 15 years and over, 53.7 per cent were married and 9 per cent were either divorced or separated.

Population growth in the City of Griffith between the  When compared with total population growth of Australia for the same period, being 12.73 per cent, population growth in the City of Griffith local government area was significantly lower than the national average. The median weekly income of $1056 for residents within the City of Griffith was lower than the national average of $1,234.

Economy

The agricultural industry and value added food and beverage manufacturing / processing underpins the strength of the region. The area is a major wine grape growing area, prune, rice and citrus with emerging industries such as; nuts (Almonds and Walnuts), chicken breeding, growing and processing, cotton, cereals, mixed farming, fruit (melons, pumpkins, onions, cherries, tomatoes, olives) and aquaculture.

The Griffith area relies heavily on the gravity fed irrigation scheme, managed by privately owned Murrumbidgee Irrigation. Our red loam soils and Mediterranean climate is conducive to ideal growing conditions for most crops. Agriculture is a vitally important industry economically for the region in terms of value, the number of people the industry employs, innovation, value added processing and the global and dynamic business that exists here because of agriculture. Griffith is a major service centre for the agricultural sector (among others) and services a region with a population of 50,000 people.

Griffith has 12 wineries – 5 of which are on the top 10 exporters list for Australia, all of which are family owned and run businesses. Griffith's largest winery, Casella Family Wines employs 650 people, employment in the wine industry increases during the vintage season (December through to April). The region supplies 75% of NSW wine grapes and exports over $800m worth of wine each year.

Griffith has two large juice companies – Real Juice and Harvey Fresh which supports the Valencia growers in the region, as well as carrots, beetroot, apple and pear. The region supplies 70% of NSW citrus, many of the navels and mandarins grown here are exported.

Treetops Olives Plantation also process olives in brine for the table market. Many of these are sold to a local food processor who marinades, makes tapenade as well as other sauces and product.

Griffith producers 25% of Australia's poultry with an emphasis on growth. Baiada Poultry purchased Bartters and the Steggles brand 5 years ago and has identified Griffith as one of the major centre's for chicken production in Australia. The plan is to double production from processing 750,000 birds a week to 1.5million a week. This phenomenal growth will require addition broiler chicken farms in the order of 200 sheds in the region.  Baiada Poultry is the largest employer in Griffith, employing close to 700 people and with their growth plans complete will employ close to 900 people with up to 200 external jobs created.

The broader region supplies Australia with 90% of their rice and an above average year for rice would produce more than 1,000,000 tonnes of rice, there is also major processing of rice at Sunrice in Leeton, Coleambally and Deniliquin who are a major employer with a global footprint.

Health and education
Griffith is a major centre for health services with an excellent facility in Griffith Base Hospital and the addition of St Vincent's Community Private Hospital soon to be built to cater for day surgeries and specialist appointments. The new St Vincent's Private Hospital will employ 35 staff, 40 at full capacity.

Education is well catered for in Griffith with an MOU recently signed with Deakin University, TAFE NSW – Riverina Institute, Griffith, Wagga and Albury Councils to encourage degree pathways through TAFE and research collaborations with local industry. An existing MOU exists with CSU.

Council

Current composition and election method
Griffith City Council is composed of twelve Councillors, including the Mayor, for a fixed four-year term of office. The Mayor is directly elected while the eleven other Councillors are elected proportionally as one entire ward. The most recent election was held on 10 September 2016, and the makeup of the Council, including the Mayor, is as follows:

The current Council, elected in 2021, is:

Sister cities

Griffith has sister city relations with the following cities:

 Harbin, China
 Treviso, Italy
 City of Fairfield, New South Wales, Australia

References

 
Griffith
Griffith
Griffith, New South Wales